Itaballia pandosia, the Pisonis mimic or brown-bordered white, is a butterfly in the family Pieridae. It is found in the Amazonian regions of Brazil, Ecuador, Peru, and in Central America, Colombia and Venezuela. The habitat consists of primary rainforests. It may be a mimic of Moschoneura pinthous

The larvae possibly feed on the leaves of Capparis species.

Subspecies
The following subspecies are recognised:
I. p. pandosia (Venezuela)
I. p. pisonis (Hewitson, 1861) (Ecuador, Peru, Brazil: Amazonas)
I. p. kicaha (Reakirt, [1864]) (Honduras, Costa Rica, Panama, Guatemala)
I. p. sabata (Fruhstorfer, 1907) (Colombia)

References

Pierini
Butterflies described in 1853
Fauna of Brazil
Pieridae of South America
Taxa named by William Chapman Hewitson